Dino Slavić (born 4 December 1992, in Rijeka) is a Croatian handball player who plays for RK Zagreb.

Career
Slavić started his handball career in his hometown club RK Zamet. At Zamet he spent eight years mostly goalkeeping with colleague Marin Đurica.

In 2012 alongside RK Zamet he got the finals of the Croatian Cup. The next season, he played his first EHF Cup match.

Honours

RK Zamet
Croatian Cup
Finalist (1): 2012

Individual
Dukat Premier League best saves percentage in 2011-12 season - 41,6%
Dukat Premier League best breakthrough percentage in 2011-12 season - 55,0%
Dukat Premier League best fastbreak percentage in 2012-13 season - 32,5%
Dukat Premier League best wing percentage in 2014-15 - 44,4%
Dukat Premier League best 9m percentage in 2014-15 - 52,4%
Dukat Premier League best 9m percentage in 2015-16 - 48,2%
Dukat Premier League best 6m percentage in 2015-16 - 27,4%
Dukat Premier League best fastbreak percentage in 2015-16 - 28,3%
Dukat Premier League best fastbreak save percentage in 2015-16 - 0,50 avg.
Dukat Premier League most fastbreak saves in 2015-16 - 17 avg.

References

External links
 Premier League stats
 Player Info in European competitions

Croatian male handball players
Handball players from Rijeka
RK Zamet players
1992 births
Living people